Metro Detroit is a major metropolitan area in the U.S. state of Michigan, consisting of the city of Detroit and over 200 municipalities in the surrounding area. There are varied definitions of the area, including the official statistical areas designated by the Office of Management and Budget, a federal agency of the United States. 

Metro Detroit is known for its automotive heritage, arts, entertainment, popular music, food, cultural diversity, and sports. The area includes a variety of natural landscapes, parks, and beaches, with a recreational coastline linking the Great Lakes. Metro Detroit also has one of the largest metropolitan economies in the U.S. with 17 Fortune 500 companies.

Definitions

This urbanized area covers parts of the counties of Macomb, Oakland, and Wayne.

The Office of Management and Budget (OMB), a federal agency of the United States, defines the Detroit–Warren–Dearborn Metropolitan Statistical Area (MSA) as the six counties of Lapeer, Livingston, Macomb, Oakland, St. Clair, and Wayne.

Detroit–Warren–Dearborn Metropolitan Statistical Area 

The nine county area designated by the OMB as the Detroit–Warren–Ann Arbor Combined Statistical Area (CSA) includes the Detroit–Warren–Dearborn MSA and the three additional counties of Genesee, Monroe, and Washtenaw (which include the metropolitan areas of Flint, Monroe, and Ann Arbor, respectively). Lenawee County was removed from the CSA in 2000, but added back in 2013.

Detroit–Warren–Ann Arbor Combined Statistical Area 

With the adjacent city of Windsor, Ontario, and its suburbs, the combined Detroit–Windsor area has a population of about 5.7 million. When the nearby Toledo metropolitan area and its commuters are taken into account, the region constitutes a much larger population center. An estimated 46 million people live within a  radius of Detroit proper. Metro Detroit is at the center of an emerging Great Lakes Megalopolis.

Conan Smith, a businessperson quoted in a 2012 article by The Ann Arbor News, stated the most significant reason Washtenaw County, including Ann Arbor, is not often included in definitions of Metro Detroit is that there is a "lack of affinity that Washtenaw County as a whole has with Wayne County and Detroit or Oakland County and Macomb". Ann Arbor is nearly 43 miles by car from Downtown Detroit, and developed separately as a university city, with its own character. Smith said that county residents "just don't yet see ourselves as a natural part of that [Detroit] region, so I think it feels a little forced to a lot of people, and they're scared about it".

Economy

Detroit and the surrounding region constitute a major center of commerce and global trade, most notably as home to America's 'Big Three' automobile companies: General Motors, Ford, and Chrysler. Detroit's six-county Metropolitan Statistical Area (MSA) has a population of about 4.3 million and a workforce of about 2.1 million. In December 2017, the Department of Labor reported metropolitan Detroit's unemployment rate at 4.2%. The Detroit MSA had a Gross Metropolitan Product (GMP) of $252.7 billion as of September 2017.

Firms in the region pursue emerging technologies including biotechnology, nanotechnology, information technology, and hydrogen fuel cell development.

Metro Detroit is one of the leading health care economies in the U.S., according to a 2003 study measuring health care industry components, with the region's hospital sector ranked fourth in the nation.

Casino gaming plays an important economic role, with Detroit the largest US city to offer casino resort hotels. Caesars Windsor, Canada's largest, complements the MGM Grand Detroit, MotorCity Casino, and Hollywood Casino in the city. The casino hotels contribute significant tax revenue along with thousands of jobs for residents. Gaming revenues have grown steadily, with Detroit ranked as the fifth-largest gambling market in the United States for 2007. When Casino Windsor is included, Detroit's gambling market ranks either third or fourth.

There are about four thousand factories in the area. The domestic auto industry is primarily headquartered in Metro Detroit. The area is an important source of engineering job opportunities. A rise in automated manufacturing using robotic technology has created related industries in the area.

A 2004 Border Transportation Partnership study showed that 150,000 jobs in the Detroit–Windsor region and $13 billion in annual production depend on the city's international border crossing.

In addition to property taxes, residents of the City of Detroit pay an income tax rate of 2.50%.

Detroit automakers and local manufacturers have made significant restructurings in response to market competition. GM made its initial public offering (IPO) of stock in 2010, after bankruptcy, bailout, and restructuring by the federal government. Domestic automakers reported significant profits in 2010, interpreted by some analysts as the beginning of an industry rebound and an economic recovery for the Detroit area.

The region's nine-county area, with its population of 5.3 million, has a workforce of about 2.6 million and about 247,000 businesses. Fourteen Fortune 500 companies are based in metropolitan Detroit. In April 2015, the metropolitan Detroit unemployment rate was 5.1 percent, a rate lower than the New York, Los Angeles, Chicago and Atlanta metropolitan areas.

Metro Detroit has made Michigan's economy a leader in information technology, biotechnology, and advanced manufacturing. Michigan ranks fourth nationally in high-tech employment with 568,000 high-tech workers, including 70,000 in the automotive industry.

Michigan typically ranks second or third in overall Research & development (R&D) expenditures in the United States. Metro Detroit is an important source of engineering and high-tech job opportunities.  As the home of the "Big Three" American automakers (General Motors, Ford, and Chrysler), it is the world's traditional automotive center and a key pillar of the U.S. economy. In the 2010s, the domestic auto industry accounts, directly and indirectly, for one of ten jobs in the United States, making it a significant component for economic recovery.

For 2010, the domestic automakers have reported significant profits indicating the beginning of rebound.

Metro Detroit serves as the headquarters for the United States Army TACOM Life Cycle Management Command (TACOM), with Selfridge Air National Guard Base. Detroit Metropolitan Airport (DTW) is one of America's largest and most recently modernized facilities, with six major runways, Boeing 747 maintenance facilities, and an attached Westin Hotel and Conference Center.

Detroit is a major U.S. port with an extensive toll-free expressway system.  A 2004 Border Transportation Partnership study showed that 150,000 jobs in the Detroit-Windsor region and $13 billion in annual production depend on Detroit's international border crossing. A source of top talent,  the University of Michigan in Ann Arbor is one of the world's leading research institutions, and Wayne State University in Detroit has the largest single-campus medical school in the United States.

Metro Detroit is a prominent business center, with major commercial districts such as the Detroit Financial District and Renaissance Center, the Southfield Town Center, and the historic New Center district with the Fisher Building and Cadillac Place. Among the major companies based in the area, aside from the major automotive companies, are BorgWarner (Auburn Hills), Rocket Mortgage (Downtown Detroit), Ally Financial (Downtown Detroit), Carhartt (Dearborn), and Shinola (Detroit).

IBM and Google are among the technology companies with a major presence in Metro Detroit. HP Enterprise Services makes Detroit its regional headquarters, and one of its largest global employment locations. The metropolitan Detroit area has one of the nation's largest office markets with 147,082,003 square feet. Chrysler's largest corporate facility is its U.S. headquarters and technology center in the Detroit suburb of Auburn Hills, while Ford Motor Company is in Dearborn, directly adjacent to Detroit.  In the decade leading up to 2006, downtown Detroit gained more than $15 billion in new investment from private and public sectors.

Tourism

Tourism is an important component of the region's culture and economy, comprising nine percent of the area's two million jobs. About 15.9 million people visit metro Detroit annually, spending about $4.8 billion. Detroit is the largest city or metro area in the U.S. to offer casino resort hotels (MGM Grand Detroit, MotorCity Casino, Hollywood Casino, and nearby Caesars Windsor).

Metro Detroit is a tourist destination that easily accommodates super-sized crowds to events such as the Woodward Dream Cruise, North American International Auto Show, the Windsor-Detroit International Freedom Festival, 2009 NCAA Final Four, and Super Bowl XL. The Detroit International Riverfront links the Renaissance Center to a series of venues, parks, restaurants, and hotels.  In 2006, the four-day Motown Winter Blast drew a cold weather crowd of about 1.2 million people to Campus Martius Park area downtown.

Detroit's metroparks include fresh water beaches, such as Metropolitan Beach, Kensington Beach, and Stony Creek Beach. Metro Detroit offers canoeing through the Huron-Clinton Metroparks. Sports enthusiasts can enjoy downhill and cross-county skiing at Alpine Valley Ski Resort, Mt. Brighton, Mt. Holly, and Pine Knob Ski Resort.

The Detroit River International Wildlife Refuge is the only international wildlife preserve in North America that is located in the heart of a major metropolitan area.  The Refuge includes islands, coastal wetlands, marshes, shoals, and waterfront lands along  of the Detroit River and Western Lake Erie shoreline.

Metro Detroit contains a number of shopping malls, including the upscale Somerset Collection in Troy, Great Lakes Crossing Outlets in Auburn Hills, and Twelve Oaks Mall in Novi, all of which are draws for tourists.

The region's leading attraction is The Henry Ford, located in the Detroit suburb of Dearborn; it is America's largest indoor-outdoor museum complex.

The recent renovation of the Renaissance Center, and related construction of a state-of-the-art cruise ship dock, new stadiums, and a new RiverWalk, have stimulated related private economic development. Nearby Windsor has a 19-year-old drinking age with a myriad of entertainment to complement Detroit's Greektown district. Some analysts believe that tourism planners have yet to tap the full economic power of the estimated 46 million people who live within a 300-mile (480-km) radius of Detroit.

Demographics

 

Metro Detroit is a six-county metropolitan statistical area (MSA) with a population of 4,392,041—making it the 14th-largest MSA in the United States as enumerated by the 2020 United States Census.

The Detroit region is a ten-county Combined Statistical Area (CSA) with a population of 5,325,219—making it the 12th-largest CSA in the United States as enumerated by the 2020 Census. 

The Detroit–Windsor area, a commercial link straddling the Canada-U.S. border, has a total population of about 5,700,000.

As of the census of 2010, there were 4,296,250 people, 1,682,111 households, and 1,110,454 families residing within the metropolitan statistical area. The census reported 70.1% White, 22.8% African American, 0.3% Native American, 3.3% Asian, 0.02% Pacific Islander, 1.2% from other races, and 2.2% from two or more races. Hispanic or Latino of any race were 6.2% of the population. Arab Americans were at least 4.7% of the region's population (considered white in the US Census).

As of the 2010 American Community Survey estimates, the median income for a household in the MSA was $48,198, and the median income for a family was $62,119.  The per capita income for the MSA was $25,403.  The region's foreign-born population sat at 8.6%. The region contains the largest concentration of Arab-Americans in the United States, particularly in Dearborn. The metro area also has the 25th largest Jewish population worldwide.

In 1701, French officer Antoine de La Mothe Cadillac, along with fifty-one additional French-Canadians, founded a settlement called Fort Ponchartrain du Détroit, naming it after the comte de Pontchartrain, Minister of Marine under Louis XIV. The French legacy can be observed today in the names of many area cities (ex. Detroit, Grosse Pointe, Grosse Ile) and streets (ex. Gratiot, Beaubien, St. Antoine, Cadieux). Later came an influx of persons of British and German descent, followed by Polish, Irish, Italian, Lebanese, Assyrian/Chaldean, Greek, Jewish, Maltese, and Belgian immigrants who made their way to the area in the early 20th century and during and after World War II. There was a large migration of African Americans into the city from the rural South during The Great Migration and following World War I.

Today, the Detroit suburbs in Oakland County, Macomb County, and northeastern and northwestern Wayne County are predominantly ethnic European American. Oakland County is among the most affluent counties in the United States, with a population of more than one million.  In Wayne County, the city of Dearborn has a large concentration of Arab Americans, mainly Shi'ite Muslim Lebanese, whose ancestors immigrated here in the early 20th century. Recently, the area has witnessed some growth in ethnic Albanian, Asian and Hispanic populations.

Metro Detroit has a sizeable population of Indian Americans, with an estimated 1.5% of the population being of Indian descent. Indians Americans in Metro Detroit are employed in various engineering and medical fields.

In the 2000s, 115 of the 185 cities and townships in Metro Detroit were more than 95% white. African Americans have also moved to the suburbs: in 2000 44% of the more than 240,000 suburban blacks lived in Inkster, Pontiac, Oak Park, and Southfield.

Transportation

Airports

The largest airport in the area is Detroit Metropolitan Wayne County Airport (DTW) in Romulus, an international airport that serves as a commercial hub for Delta Air Lines and Spirit Airlines.

The other airports in the metropolitan area are:

 Ann Arbor Municipal Airport (ARB)
 Coleman A. Young International Airport (DET) (Detroit) - General aviation only
 Flint-Bishop International Airport(FNT) (Flint) - Commercial airport
 Oakland County International Airport (PTK) Waterford Township - Charter passenger facility
 St. Clair County International Airport (near Port Huron, Michigan) - An international airport on the Canada–US border.
 Selfridge Air National Guard Base (Mount Clemens) - Military airbase
 Willow Run Airport (YIP) (Ypsilanti) - Cargo, general aviation, charter passenger traffic

Transit systems
Bus service for the metropolitan area is provided jointly by the Detroit Department of Transportation (DDOT) and Suburban Mobility Authority for Regional Transportation (SMART) which operate under a cooperative service and fare agreement.  The elevated Detroit People Mover encircles downtown providing service to numerous downtown hotels, offices and attractions.  The Woodward Avenue Streetcar has recently began service to provide service between downtown and New Center, and the proposed SEMCOG Commuter Rail would extend from Detroit's New Center area to The Henry Ford, Dearborn, Detroit Metropolitan Airport, Ypsilanti, and Ann Arbor  The Regional Transit Authority (RTA) was established in December 2012 to coordinate the services of all existing transit providers, and to develop a bus rapid transit service along Woodward Avenue.

Roads and freeways

The Metro Detroit area is linked by an advanced network of major roads and freeways which include Interstate highways. Traditionally, Detroiters refer to some of their freeways by name rather than route number. The Davison, Lodge, and Southfield freeways are almost always referred to by name rather than route number. Detroiters commonly precede freeway names with the word 'the' as in the Lodge, the Southfield, and the Davison. Those without names are referred to by number.

Surface street navigation in Metro Detroit is commonly anchored by "mile roads", major east–west surface streets that are spaced at one-mile (1.6 km) intervals and increment as one travels north and away from the city center. Mile roads sometimes have two names, the numeric name (ex. 15 Mile Road) used in Macomb County and a local name (ex. Maple Road) used in Oakland County mostly.

Education

Colleges and universities  

 Baker College — Auburn Hills and Royal Oak
 Cleary University — Detroit and Howell
 College for Creative Studies — Detroit
 Concordia University Ann Arbor — Ann Arbor
 Cranbrook Academy of Art — Bloomfield Hills
 Davenport University — Detroit and Warren
 Dorsey College — Dearborn, Madison Heights, Roseville, Wayne and Woodhaven
 Eastern Michigan University — Ypsilanti
 Henry Ford College — Dearborn
 Kettering University — Flint
 Lawrence Technological University — Southfield
 Macomb Community College — Warren and Clinton Township
 Madonna University — Livonia
 Michigan State University Management Education Center — Troy
 Monroe County Community College — Monroe
 Mott Community College — Flint
 Northwood University — Midland
 Oakland Community College — Auburn Hills, Farmington Hills, Highland Lakes, Royal Oak and Southfield
 Oakland University — Auburn Hills and Rochester Hills
 Rochester College — Rochester
 Saint Clair County Community College — Port Huron
 St. Clair College — Windsor, Ontario
 Schoolcraft College — Livonia
 Specs Howard School of Media Arts — Southfield
 Sacred Heart Major Seminary — Detroit
 SS. Cyril and Methodius Seminary — Orchard Lake
 University of Detroit Mercy — Detroit
 University of Michigan — Ann Arbor
 University of Michigan–Dearborn — Dearborn
 University of Michigan–Flint — Flint
 University of Windsor — Windsor, Ontario
 Walsh College — Troy
 Washtenaw Community College — Ann Arbor
 Wayne County Community College — Detroit
 Wayne State University — Detroit

Crime 

The principal City of Detroit has struggled with high crime for decades. About half of all murders in Michigan in 2015 occurred in Detroit. 
Since 2013, the FBI has reported a 26% decrease in property crimes and a 27% decrease in violent crimes.

Sports

Professional sports has a major fan following in Metro Detroit. The area is home to many sports teams, including six professional teams in four major sports. The area's several universities field teams in a variety of sports. Michigan Stadium, home of the Michigan Wolverines, is the largest American football stadium in the world. Metro Detroit hosts many annual sporting events including auto and hydroplane racing. The area has hosted many major sporting events, including the 1994 FIFA World Cup, Super Bowl XVI, Super Bowl XL, Wrestlemania 23, the 2005 Major League Baseball All-Star Game, many Stanley Cup Championship rounds, the first two games of the 2006 World Series, and the last two games of the 2012 World Series.

The Michigan International Speedway in Brooklyn hosts various Auto racing: NASCAR, INDYCAR, and ARCA.
The Detroit River hosts Hydroplane racing held by the APBA for the Detroit APBA Gold Cup.

Area codes
Metro Detroit is served by nine telephone area codes (six not including Windsor). The 313 area code, which used to encompass all of Southeast Michigan, is today confined exclusively to the City of Detroit and several neighboring Wayne County suburbs.
 The 248 area code along with the newer 947 area code overlay mostly serve Oakland County.
 Macomb County is largely served by 586.
 Genesee, St. Clair, and Lapeer counties, eastern Livingston County, and part of northern Oakland County are covered by 810.
 Washtenaw, Monroe, and most of the Wayne County suburbs are in the 734 area.
 The Windsor area (and most of southwestern Ontario) is served by an overlay complex of three codes — 519, 226, and 548.

References

External links

 Metro Detroit Convention and Visitors Bureau
 Southeast Michigan Council of Governments
 City Charter of Detroit
 Michigan's Official Economic Development and Travel Site.
 
 Map of Michigan Lighthouse (PDF)
Collection: "Detroit Metro" from the University of Michigan Museum of Art

 
Geography of Detroit